Reynolds Winsor "Reyn" Guyer (born in St. Paul, Minnesota in 1935) is an American inventor.

Inventions
Among his notable developments are Twister in 1967 and the NERF ball in 1969, which he developed for Milton Bradley and Parker Brothers, respectively. He was inducted into the Hasbro toy and game Inventors' Hall of Fame in 1986.

Besides his work as a toy inventor, Guyer has also founded a music publishing company called Wrensong/Reynsong Music of Nashville in 1985.

Philanthropy 
Having struggled with dyslexia himself, Reyn cofounded Winsor Learning in 1991 to help children who also struggle to read. The Sonday System and Let's Play Learn are effective remediation methods for students who are behind in their reading skills. These programs are used in hundreds of school systems across the country.

Current Projects 
 My Friend Wren is Reyn's current project. My Friend Wren is a thoughtfully crafted collection of creative and gentle children's stories and songs designed to provide insightful, educational material and adventure to both kids and parents alike. Reyn narrates and sings every story and song himself.
 The Curly Lasagna project, a series of stories and songs for kids and parents that he created with Jeff Harrington
 A dice game Rally Roll, which he invented in 2014
 Creating sculptures and artwork, many of which are in private collections
 A new lawn game called King's Court

References

External links
Official website
Patent for Twister

1935 births
Toy inventors
20th-century American inventors
Living people
People from Saint Paul, Minnesota
Dartmouth College alumni